Mohamed Ouattara (born 7 March 1993) is a Burkinabé professional footballer who plays as a defender for Al-Minaa and the Burkina Faso national team.

Club career
In August 2017, Ouattara moved to play in the Botola, where he signed with Wydad Casablanca on a three-year contract, and won the 2017 CAF Champions League, the 2018 CAF Super Cup, and the 2017–18 Botola runner-up with him. In January 2018, Ouattara was loaned to RAC Casablanca to make room for the signing of Argentine player Alejandro Quintana. In August 2018, he signed a two-year contract with Olympic Safi.

In March 2021, Ouattara moved to play in the Jordanian Pro League, signing a one-year contract with Al-Salt, and reached with them the final of the FA Cup and finished runner-up.

International career
In August 2017, Ouattara was selected for Burkina Faso's two matches against Senegal in the 2018 FIFA World Cup qualification.

Honours
Étoile Filante
Burkinabé Premier League: 2013–14

Wydad Casablanca
CAF Champions League: 2017
CAF Super Cup: 2018
Botola runner-up: 2017–18

Al-Salt
Jordan FA Cup runner-up: 2021

References

External links
 
 
 
 
 
 

1993 births
Living people
People from Bobo-Dioulasso
Association football defenders
Burkinabé footballers
Burkina Faso international footballers
Wydad AC players
Racing de Casablanca players
Olympic Club de Safi players
Al-Salt SC players
Al-Mina'a SC players
Expatriate footballers in Iraq
Burkinabé expatriate sportspeople in Iraq
Botola players
Burkinabé expatriate footballers
Burkinabé expatriate sportspeople in Morocco
Expatriate footballers in Morocco
Expatriate footballers in Jordan
21st-century Burkinabé people